Yuzhnoye Butovo District (Southern Butovo) is the biggest residential district in South-Western Administrative Okrug of Moscow, Russia. The district's history dates back to 1612, and it is named after a Don Cossack Butov. The population (July 2016) was 207,903.

Butovo memorial

Situated approximately 27 km south-east of Moscow, Butovo is the site of the Butovo firing range, a mass grave dating from the "Great Purge" of the 1930s. In excess of 20,000 people were shot and buried there from August 1937 to October 1938 . It has become a shrine to Joseph Stalin's victims and has an Orthodox church on the grounds.

References

External links

Districts of Moscow
1612 establishments in Russia